The Way I Feel may refer to:

Albums 
 The Way I Feel (Gordon Lightfoot album), or the title song
 The Way I Feel (John Patton album), or the title song
 The Way I Feel (Leonard Nimoy album)
 The Way I Feel (Remy Shand album), or the title song
 The Way I Feel (Sonny Rollins album)
 The Way I Feel (Phil Upchurch album)
 The Way I Feel (Bill Anderson album)
 The Way I Feel, by Boyd Rice
 The Way I Feel, by Irma Thomas

Songs 
 "The Way I Feel", by 12 Stones from 12 Stones
 "The Way I Feel", by Jan Hellriegel
 "The Way I Feel", by Paul Oakenfold from A Lively Mind
 "The Way I Feel", by Rancid from ...And Out Come the Wolves
 "The Way I Feel", by The Wanted from The Wanted
 "The Way I Feel", by Keane from Cause and Effect
 "The Way I Feel", by Dude York from Sincerely
 "The Way I Feel", by Gary Wright, a B-side of single "Back To The Magic"
 "The Way I Feel", by Air Supply

See also
 The Way I Feel Today (Six by Seven album)
 The Way I Feel Today (Stan Ridgway album)